The Leyland-DAB Lion was a mid-engined double-decker bus chassis manufactured by Leyland between 1986 and 1988.

History
The Leyland-DAB Lion was designed as a mid-engined double-decker bus chassis based on a Danish Automobile Building design. Only 32 were built for Clydeside Scottish, Eastern Scottish and Nottingham City Transport.

Following the takeover of Leyland by Volvo, the Lion ceased production in 1988.

References

External links

Double-decker buses
Lion
Vehicles introduced in 1986
Bus chassis